Bekişler is a village in the Mecitözü District of Çorum Province in Turkey. Its population is 300 (2022).

References

Villages in Mecitözü District